"Give Your Heart a Break" is a song recorded by American singer Demi Lovato for her third studio album Unbroken (2011). It was released on January 23, 2012, by Hollywood Records, as the second and final single from the album. The song was written and produced by Josh Alexander and Billy Steinberg. "Give Your Heart a Break" incorporates drums, violin and strings. The latter two, according to music critics, are reminiscent of those used in Coldplay's "Viva la Vida". Lyrically, the song chronicles the protagonist's attempt to win over her lover who has been hurt in a previous relationship and is fearful of committing again.

"Give Your Heart a Break" received acclaim from music critics, who mostly praised the production and Lovato's vocals. The single debuted at number 72 on the Billboard Hot 100 and peaked at number 16 on the chart, as well as reaching number one on the Billboard Pop Songs chart. The song has debuted at number 33 in New Zealand and has peaked at number nine, marking the first time Lovato had two top 10 singles from one album in the country.

Background
Originally, it was announced the second single from the album "Who's That Boy" (featuring Dev), but later was scrapped due to Dev's pregnancy. "Give Your Heart a Break" was written and produced by Josh Alexander and Billy Steinberg, who are known for her work on The Veronicas' sophomore studio album, Hook Me Up, as well as JoJo's "Too Little Too Late". Alexander is credited with having a bigger hand in the song's production, handling all the instruments while programming, recording and engineering the song. Chris Garcia shared engineering credits with Alexander while Scott Roewe is credited with providing Logic and Pro Tools technology. According to MTV, Lovato explained that despite the play on the word "heartbreak" in the title, the song is about the exact opposite. "Last year I began working on a song about a different kind of love," she said. "It's a song about showing someone you love that you're the one right in front of them. This is a song about faith."

Composition
"Give Your Heart a Break" is three minutes and twenty-five seconds long. The song uses the instruments such as the suspenseful strings that sounds similar to that used in Coldplay's "Viva la Vida".  According to the digital music sheet published at Musicnotes.com by Kobalt Music Publishing America, Inc., "Give Your Heart a Break" is written in the key of G major. It is set in common time and has a moderate tempo of 123 beats per minute. The song follows the chord progression of C2 – G– Amaj7(add 4) – D. Lovato's vocal range spans over two octaves, from the low note of E3 to the high note of G5.

Critical reception
"Give Your Heart a Break" received acclaim from music critics. Joe DeAndrea of AbsolutePunk praised the song along with "Mistake" as ballads going "far and beyond anything in Lovato's prior arsenal. It sets a mark as to what should be expected from similar artists such as her, but in the process, distancing herself from being grouped with them becoming a solo entity." Jason Scott of the Seattle Post-Intelligencer noted that the song, along with "Mistake" and "Hold Up", feature "electrically forceful instrumentation". Jocelyn Vena of MTV complimented it as a smart dance song, along with "Hold Up".

In another extensive review, Laurence Green from musicOMH praised the track, calling it an "exceptionally brilliant track," while commenting that she had "become the true pop heroine; backed up by infinitely bigger, better choruses." Sam Lansky, a writer and editor for MTV's Buzzworthy Blog, lauded the recording for presenting Lovato's vocals as a masterpiece and praised the production as "superb".

Chart performance
"Give Your Heart a Break" peaked at number 16 on the US Billboard Hot 100, marking Lovato's seventh highest-peaking single in the nation. The song topped the US Pop Songs chart, becoming Lovato's first number one there, while reaching number 12 on the US Adult Top 40 chart, number 16 on the US Adult Contemporary chart, and at number 21 on the US Digital Songs chart. With 25 weeks, "Give Your Heart a Break" previously shared the record of longest ascendance to the summit of the Mainstream Top 40 with Cee Lo Green's "Fuck You". In August 2021, Billboard revealed the song is Lovato's most-heard on US radio accumulating 2.9 billion all-format audience impressions.

Internationally, "Give Your Heart a Break" performed moderately; on the Belgium (Ultratop 50 Flanders) chart, the song peaked at number 32, her first appearance and highest position on the chart where it spent a total of nine weeks on the chart. In New Zealand, the song debuted at number 33, her third song to chart on the top 40 and has so far reached a peak of number nine, marking the first time Lovato had two top 10 singles from one album in the country. In April 2014, the song was certified triple platinum by the Recording Industry Association of America; as of October 2017, it has sold 2.2 million digital downloads.

Music video

The music video for "Give Your Heart a Break" was filmed in late February 2012 and is directed by Justin Francis. The video premiered on E! on April 2, and was released by Vevo on April 3, 2012. A few teasers for the video were previously uploaded on Lovato's official YouTube channel. According to Lovato about "the new music video, I'm basically trying to convince a guy that I didn't break his heart, and we get into a fight and I try to win him over again" and "So I do something special for him at the end of the song".

The video begins with Lovato and her boyfriend (portrayed by Alex Bechet) having an argument over the phone. After hanging up, Lovato collects all the photos of them together from their apartment. Later that night, Lovato walks to her boyfriend's apartment and pastes the photos on a wall across the street from his front door. Each picture has a memory behind it, which is recounted by her. Lovato's boyfriend looks out the window as he sees a large collage of pictures, depicting a picture of them smiling. The video ends with Lovato walking away as she turns around and smiles, confident that her plan has worked. 

A lyric video was released on December 23, 2011, which features Lovato sitting on the swing and writing the lyrics in a journal, right next to a waterfall and firepit, presumably writing her thoughts in the form of the song. At the end of the video, Lovato closes her journal and leaves it on the swing.

Live performances
On December 31, 2011, Lovato promoted the song at the MTV New Year's Eve's concert, which she co-hosted with Tyler Posey. On January 11, 2012, Lovato performed the song at the People's Choice Awards, where she also received the "Best Pop Artist" award afterwards. On March 15, 2012, Lovato performed the single from the results show episode of American Idol season 11. The song was included on Lovato's set list for a free concert on July 6, 2012, as part of Good Morning America Summer Concert Series. Lovato performed the song at the 2012 MTV Video Music Awards pre-show on September 6, 2012. On September 25, 2012, Lovato performed the song on Katie Couric's talk show Katie. Lovato performed the song at the VH1 Divas 2012, with the theme dance party on December 16, 2012. Three days later, Lovato performed the song with Fifth Harmony on the second-season finale of The X Factor. Lovato performed the song along with "Heart Attack" and "Neon Lights" at the 2nd Indonesian Choice Awards on May 24, 2015. Lovato performed the track during her headlining concert tours A Special Night with Demi Lovato, The Neon Lights Tour, Demi World Tour, Future Now Tour, and the Tell Me You Love Me World Tour.

Credits and personnel
Recording and management
 Mixed at Cryptic Studios 
 Mastered at Capitol Mastering 
 Jerk Awake/Jetanon Music (ASCAP)

Personnel

Demi Lovato – lead vocals, background vocals
Josh Alexander – songwriting, production, recording, engineering, mixing, all instruments, programming
Billy Steinberg – songwriting, production
Chris Garcia – recording, engineering
Scott Roewe – logic and Pro Tools
Jaden Michaels – additional background vocals
Robert Vosgien – mastering

Credits adapted from Unbroken liner notes.

Awards and nominations

Track listings

Charts

Weekly charts

Year-end charts

Certifications

Release history

See also
 List of Mainstream Top 40 number-one hits of 2012 (U.S.)
 Billboard Year-End Hot 100 singles of 2012

References

External links
 

2012 singles
Demi Lovato songs
Pop ballads
2010s ballads
Dance-pop songs
Songs written by Billy Steinberg
Hollywood Records singles
Songs written by Josh Alexander
2011 songs
Song recordings produced by Billy Steinberg
Torch songs
Songs about telephone calls